R323 road may refer to:
 R323 road (Ireland)
 R323 road (South Africa)